Propylpyrazoletriol (PPT) is a synthetic, nonsteroidal agonist of ERα with 400-fold selectivity over ERβ that is used widely in scientific research to study the function of ERα. Though originally thought to be highly selective for ERα, PPT has subsequently been found to also act as an agonist of the GPER (GPR30).

See also 
 ERA-45
 ERA-63
 GTx-758
 Methylpiperidinopyrazole (MPP)

References 

GPER agonists
Ketones
Phenols
Pyrazoles
Synthetic estrogens